The Farrukhnagar–Saharanpur Janta Express is an Express train belonging to Northern Railway zone that runs between  and  in India. It is currently being operated with 14545/14546 train numbers on a daily basis.

Service

The 14545/Farrukhnagar–Saharanpur Janta Express averages a speed of 26 km/hr and covers 217 km in 8h 15m. The 14546/Saharanpur–Farrukhnagar Janta Express averages a speed of 33 km/hr and covers 217 km in 6h 35m.

Route and halts 

The important halts of the train are:

Coach composition

The train has standard ICF rakes with max speed of 110 kmph. The train consists of 14 coaches:
 12 General Unreserved
 2 Seating cum Luggage Rake

Traction

Both trains are hauled by a Tuglakabad Loco Shed-based WDP-1 diesel locomotive from Farrukhnagar to Saharanpur and vice versa.

See also 

 Farrukhnagar railway station
 Saharanpur Junction railway station
 Kanpur Central–Bandra Terminus Weekly Express
 Kanpur Central–Amritsar Weekly Express

Notes

References

External links 

 14545/Farrukhnagar–Saharanpur Janta Express
 14546/Saharanpur–Farrukhnagar Janta Express

Transport in Saharanpur
Express trains in India
Rail transport in Delhi
Rail transport in Uttar Pradesh
Rail transport in Haryana